Khunak is a village in Jagat block, Budaun district, Uttar Pradesh, India. Its village code is 128339. The village is administrated by Gram panchayat. Budaun railway station is 6 KM away from the village. s per the report of 2011 Census of India, The total population of the village is 3247, where 1,693 are males and 1554 are females.

References

Villages in Budaun district